A mesoregion was a subdivision of the Brazilian states, grouping together various municipalities in proximity and with common characteristics. They were abolished in 2017 and replaced by "intermediary geographic regions". The mesoregions were created by the Brazilian Institute of Geography and Statistics for statistical purposes and did not, therefore, constitute political or administrative areas. They were further divided into microregions.

List of mesoregions
, there were 5,570 municipalities, divided among 558 microregions and 137 mesoregions:

References

 
Brazil geography-related lists
Subdivisions of Brazil

pt:Mesorregiões e microrregiões do Brasil